The Open de l'Isère is a tournament for professional female tennis players played on indoor hardcourts. The event is classified as a $60,000 ITF Women's World Tennis Tour tournament and has been held in Grenoble, France, since 2011.

Past finals

Singles

Doubles

External links
 ITF search
 Official website

ITF Women's World Tennis Tour
Hard court tennis tournaments
Tennis tournaments in France
2011 establishments in France
Recurring sporting events established in 2011